Austen Jewell Smith (born July 23, 2001, in Dallas, Texas) is an American sports shooter. She won gold medal in ISSF World Cup 2021 Shotgun in Lonato, Italy.

She is the youngest participant in U.S. Olympic shooting team for Tokyo Olympics.

References

External links 

Austen Smith (Team USA)

Living people
2001 births
American female sport shooters
Sportspeople from Dallas
Shooters at the 2020 Summer Olympics
Olympic shooters of the United States
21st-century American women